Paul Newell Broten (born October 27, 1965) is an American former professional hockey player who played in 322 games in the NHL with the New York Rangers, Dallas Stars, and St. Louis Blues. He shoots right-handed and played right wing.

Broten was picked by the New York Rangers in the 4th round, 77th overall in the 1984 NHL Entry Draft. He then went to the University of Minnesota for 4 years, scoring 45 points in 42 games his senior year. During the 1989–1990 NHL season Broten made his debut with the Rangers. He would play for the Rangers until the 1993–1994 season when he joined the Dallas Stars. He played with the Stars for 2 years before playing one year with the Blues and their minor league affiliate Worcester Ice Cats. Broten then played in the now defunct IHL and one year in Germany before retiring after the 1998–1999 hockey season.

Broten was born in Roseau, Minnesota, and is the brother of fellow hockey players Neal and Aaron Broten. He has two daughters, Jordyn and Morgan.

His nephew, Shane Gersich, was drafted by the Washington Capitals in the 2014 NHL Entry Draft.

Career statistics

Regular season and playoffs

International

External links
 

1965 births
Living people
People from Roseau, Minnesota
American men's ice hockey right wingers
Dallas Stars players
Ice hockey players from Minnesota
Minnesota Golden Gophers men's ice hockey players
New York Rangers draft picks
New York Rangers players
St. Louis Blues players